Thomas Tallis School is a large mixed comprehensive school for pupils aged 11–19, located in Kidbrooke in the Royal Borough of Greenwich, London, England. It opened in 1971, and was named after the composer Thomas Tallis, who lived in Greenwich. The school was completely rebuilt 40 years later as part of the Building Schools for the Future programme. It now has 1,985 students.

History (1971–2011)
The school was originally built in 1971 on land used for training facilities in a former RAF storage, maintenance and training facility, RAF Kidbrooke. A blue plaque recognising the school's RAF connections, in particular to the RAF Linguists' Association, was unveiled in 2008 and re-dedicated in July 2014.

In 1998, the school was awarded 'Specialist Arts College' status and was successfully re-designated twice. In 2005 it was awarded Leading Edge status. The school was part of the Creative Partnerships network of schools from its inception in 2002, through to 2011 (in May 2008, the school was one of only 30 schools in England to achieve the status of School of Creativity).

In December 2009, Director of Tate galleries, Sir Nicholas Serota was invited to become the school's head teacher for the day.

Kidbrooke School in the media

In 2005, along with nearby Kidbrooke School, the school featured in Jamie Oliver's TV series Jamie's School Dinners in which Oliver sought to improve school dinners in Britain. In 2007, the school featured in the Channel 4 documentary Make Me a Tory, directed by former pupil Daniel Cormack.

An education textbook designed by German publisher Ernst Klett Verlag uses pictures of the school.

History (2011–present)
In 2011, the school underwent a £50 million pound renovation as part of the Greenwich Building Schools for the Future programme. Occupancy of the new school took place on 7 November 2011. The school was officially opened by David Miliband in May 2012.

School facilities
Working closely with architects, John McAslan + Partners, some of the design features of the old school that were felt to be crucial in having helped shape its ethos were retained - for example, the central concourse which functions as a social hub and outdoor performance space.

The building interiors are colour-coded and signs exist to ease navigation. Most classrooms are contained in three blocks to the west of the site. Sports facilities, a canteen, performing arts spaces, specialist broadcast and music studios and other specialist classrooms make up the other blocks. The school has also paid close attention to the dining area and toilets, areas which deserve to be of the highest standards. Access to community facilities has been made easier and circulation around the building is enhanced by multi-level walkways. There is a close connection between indoor and outdoor learning facilities.

Prior to occupation of the new building, designers Gilles and Cecilie Studio were commissioned to create new furniture, wall graphics and decorations for the school. The aim of this project was to express the ethos and ambitions of the old school on the walls of the new one. The work was featured in Creative Review magazine (and received a diploma in environmental design at the Visuelt awards in Norway).

A number of places at the school are reserved for students with autistic spectrum disorder (ASD). Since 1997, the school has retained a Deaf Support Centre, integrating deaf pupils alongside their hearing peers, with specialist staff supporting teaching staff to ensure deaf students' needs are met. Deaf Awareness forms part of the pastoral programme for all students.

Notable former pupils
Dominic Cooper, actor
Simon Day, actor
Patrick van den Hauwe, professional footballer, attended from 1972-1977
Amadou Kassaraté, professional footballer
Richard Reid, failed 'Shoe Bomber' terrorist
Ihsan Rustem, dancer and choreographer
Kae Tempest, poet

References

External links

 

Secondary schools in the Royal Borough of Greenwich
Community schools in the Royal Borough of Greenwich
School buildings completed in 2011
Educational institutions established in 1971
1971 establishments in England